Mother is a 2016 Georgian short film directed by Rati Tsiteladze.

Based on a true story, the film is written and acted by Nino Varsimashvili. Mother was screened at more than 100 film festivals in more than 40 countries.

The short won the main prizes at 5th Tetova International Film Festival, 23rd Corto Imola Festival, 20th Faludi International Film Festival and 5th Mostra de Curtmetratges per la Identitat.

Synopsis
A single mother is forced to hide her child's existence, because of the social and cultural context in order not to become the subject of judgment and condemnation.

Cast 
 Nino Varsimashvili as Tea
 Natela Mamasakhlisi as Tamara
 Ana Mamasakhlisi as Cashier
 Zuka Malashkhia as Child
 Olga Slusareva as Elena
 Rati Tsiteladze as Dato
 Irma Varsimashvili as Lela
 Dea Tsiteladze as Maka
 Tako Tvauri as Reporter

Reception
The film gained national and international recognition. The film has received mostly positive reviews. Jury members from the Corto Imola Festival noted "Rati Tsiteladze has been able to tell and show, in a poetic black and white way and with an increasing suspence, the drama of a real story: a single (and alone) mother forced to hide the existence of her child in front of a community that is only able to judge and disapprove." Mostra de Curtmetratges per la Identitat noted: "PRIZE FOR THE BEST SHORT FILM: "DEDA" (Georgia, Rati Tsiteladze) for its denunciation to the repression to exercise with freedom the right to be a mother." The film brought the issue of single mothers on the surface within the region. There are over 40 000 child born from an unregistered relationship and women who give birth to the child out of wedlock, are rejected not only by their partners but also their families and society. The film has raised the question about what the government or society is doing in order to make a difference.

Awards and nominations

References

External links
 
 

2016 films
Drama films from Georgia (country)
Short films from Georgia (country)
2010s Georgian-language films